The "Fiakerlied" ("Fiaker Song") is an 1885 Viennese song written and composed by Gustav Pick.

The song was written to celebrate the centenary of the Viennese Fiaker, a horse-drawn carriage for hire. It was performed on 24 May 1885 by Alexander Girardi at a charity festival at the Rotunde in the Prater, accompanied by Nathaniel Rothschild's band conducted by Wilhelm Rab. The music was published in that year by August Cranz.

It was Gustav Pick's most successful song, and has remained popular. The song was the basis of the 1936 German film  of the same name (English title The Cabbie's Song).

References

External links
 

Wienerlied
Austrian songs
1885 songs